Shiralakoppa is a panchayat town in Shikaripur Taluk, Shivamogga district in the Indian state of Karnataka.

Geography
It has an average elevation of 595 metres (1952 feet).
Shiralakoppa is 70 km away from Shimoga and 20 km from Shikaripura.

Demographics
 India census, Shiralakoppa had a population of 14,501. Males constitute 50% of the population and females 50%. Shiralakoppa has an average literacy rate of 68%, higher than the national average of 59.5%: male literacy is 70%, and female literacy is 66%. In Shiralakoppa, 15% of the population is under 6 years of age.

Places of interest 
The historical Belligavi temple is located 2 km away from shiralakoppa. Uduthadi,  birthplace of Akka Mahadevi, is located 4 km southerly to Siralakoppa.

References

Cities and towns in Shimoga district